The 1987 Baylor Bears football team represented the Baylor University in the 1987 NCAA Division I-A football season.  The Bears finished the season fifth in the Southwest Conference.

Schedule

After the season
The following player was drafted into professional football following the season.

References

Baylor
Baylor Bears football seasons
Baylor Bears football